DSPA is an acronym for the Dutch Society for the Protection of Animals

DSPA may also refer to:

Science 
 Data Science and Predictive Analytics, a textbook authored by Ivo D. Dinov
 DNA Specimen Provenance Assignment
 a type of synthetic phospholipid derivative
 Desmodus rotundus salivary plasminogen activator, basis for Desmoteplase

Organizations
 Pyotr Alexeyev' Resistance Movement (DSPA), a former left-wing political organization in Russia
 Deadly Serious Party of Australia, a former political party
 Danish School of Public Administration, a civil organization partnered with School of Senior Civil Service
 Drone Service Providers Alliance, an organization associated with the Drone Federalism Act of 2017